The McCann Submarine Rescue Chamber is a device for rescuing submariners from a submarine that is unable to surface.

History
During the first two decades of the United States Navy Submarine Force, there were several accidents in which Navy submarines sank with the loss of life. The impetus for the invention for the chamber was the loss of S-51 on 25 September 1925 and the loss of S-4 on 17 December 1927. However, the majority soon succumbed. In her forward torpedo room, six men remained alive. Heroic efforts were made to rescue these six, who had exchanged a series of signals with divers by tapping on the hull. In extremely cold water and tangled wreckage, Navy divers worked to rescue them, but a storm forced a stop to this effort on 24 December. Forty men lost their lives.

These experiences led submariner Charles B. "Swede" Momsen to think of technical alternatives for rescuing survivors from sunken submarines, which at that time was still a virtual impossibility. Momsen soon conceived a submarine rescue chamber that could be lowered from the surface to mate with a submarine's escape hatch and proposed the concept through official channels. While in command of the submarine S-1 (SS-105), in 1926, Momsen wrote the Bureau of Construction and Repair (BuC&R) recommending the adoption of a diving bell for the purposes of rescuing entrapped personnel from submarines. But this idea was pigeonholed by the bureaucracy, even during his own subsequent assignment at BuC&R. The loss of S-4 with all hands put the Navy very much "on the spot" because of the loss of lives that might have been saved. The pressure of this incident forced favorable action and Momsen, using the aircraft hangar from S-1, designed and built a prototype submarine rescue chamber.

During the first three months of 1928, divers and other salvage personnel were able to raise S-4 and tow her to the Boston Navy Yard, where she was drydocked and repaired. She returned to active duty in October 1928 and was employed thereafter as a submarine rescue and salvage test ship. Momsen went to sea in the reconditioned S-4 to carry out practical experiments and training with the rescue chambers.

Work with S-4 helped to develop equipment and techniques that bore fruit a decade later, when 33 men were brought up alive from the sunken submarine Squalus. The first diving bells for rescuing men from submarines were designed by the BuC&R in 1928. The diving bell went through a series of tests off the shores of Key West, Florida. Based on these tests, Momsen had several changes in mind for the bell, and after nearly two years of experimentation full of highly interesting results, the final bell was evolved and christened a "rescue chamber." This success was catalyst for gaining approval for development of the submarine rescue chamber in 1930. Before he could make these changes, Momsen went to the Bureau of Construction and Repair to work on an underwater breathing apparatus (the "Momsen Lung") for individual escapes.

Lieutenant Commander Allan Rockwell McCann was put in charge of the revisions on the diving bell. From July 1929 to July 1931, McCann was assigned to the Maintenance Division, Bureau of Construction and Repair, where he developed the submarine rescue chamber. When the bell was completed in late 1930, it was produced as the McCann Submarine Rescue Chamber (SRC) (Navy designated  the first 12 of these as [YRC] 1–12, YRC-4 was lost aboard the USS Pigeon, at Bataan, Philippines, during the first days of WWII. YRC-5 was aboard the USS Widgeon during the attack on Pearl Harbor). In 1931, a one-fifth scale model of a diving bell for submarine rescue work was built and tested. Design called for the bell to withstand the external pressure encountered at a depth of at least  of water, and the test showed the model fulfilled this requirement with a factor of safety of about 3.5. Since the head of the vessel remained intact, it was decided to make a test of the head itself in order to determine its strength relative to that of the shell, and if possible to obtain some measure of the stresses occurring under load.

The revised Submarine Rescue Chamber had improvements including a soft seal gasket for sealing the submarine/bell interface skirting, and a floor installed to maintain air-space in the bell during raising and lowering. Momsen in his speech to the Harvard Engineering Society on 6 October 1939 credited Allan Rockwell McCann with the improvements which made the bell operational, safe and large enough to hold up to eight rescued crewmen and two operators.

The Squalus rescue
In  1939, the McCann Rescue Chamber made its debut when it was used to successfully rescue  thirty-three survivors from Squalus, At the time of Squalus accident, Lieutenant Commander Momsen was serving as head of the Experimental Diving Unit at the Washington Navy Yard. The submarine rescue ship USS Falcon (ASR-2), commanded by Lieutenant George A. Sharp, was on site within twenty-four hours. It lowered the Rescue Chamber — a revised version of a diving bell invented by Momsen — and, in four dives over the next 13 hours, recovered all 33 survivors in the first deep submarine rescue ever. McCann was in charge of Chamber operations, with Momsen commanding the divers. Although there was no reason to believe anyone was alive in the aft part of the ship, a fifth dive was made to the aft torpedo room hatch on May 25. This run confirmed the flooding of the entire aft portion of the ship.

Design

The rescue chamber was a pear shaped steel chamber, the big end uppermost, seven feet at the greatest diameter and ten feet high. It is divided into an upper closed compartment and a lower open compartment by a horizontal bulkhead which has a water tight hatch in its middle. Surrounding the lower compartment is a ballast tank of a capacity just equal to that of the lower compartment. The reel is operated by a shaft leading into the upper compartment. The shaft is rotated by an air motor. On the bottom edge of the lower compartment a rubber gasket is embedded into a circular groove, so that when the chamber is brought into contact with a flat surface (the hatch ring) a water tight joint may be effected with the application of pressure. Attached to the upper compartment is an air supply and an atmospheric exhaust hose, wire wound for strength. Also electric cables for telephone and light are attached. A wire pendant for hoisting and lowering is shackled into a pad-eye on top. This wire is also used for retrieving the chamber in case of emergency. The forward and after hatches of American submarines were fitted for attaching the rescue chamber. They have a flat doughnut shaped plate welded to the hatch coaming upon which the bottom of the chamber rests and a bail over the center of the hatch to which the haul down wire must be attached by the diver.

Limitations
The McCann bell suffers severe limitations in strong currents and when dealing with a pressurized submarine or one lying at extreme angles. It is also incapable of functioning below . The USN Submarine Rescue Chamber (YRC) is air transportable to a Vessel Of Opportunity (VOO) Mother Ship (MOSHIP) which requires little modification to use the system. Transfer Under Pressure (TUP) to and from pressurized environments such as submarines or hyperbaric chambers is not possible with this system, even though TUP is essential where being subjected to ambient pressure may be life-threatening. Since the creation of the Deep Submergence Rescue Vehicles Mystic and Avalon, the McCann Rescue Chamber is rarely used, but is part of the Submarine Rescue Chamber Flyaway System (SRCFS) which is capable of worldwide submarine rescue missions.  Once launched, the SRCFS is able to operate around the clock.

See also

References
Maas, Peter. The Rescuer. London: Collins, 1968

 (Television movie. The film does not acknowledge any design flaw and claims the cause is unknown.)

USS Squalus, Ship Source Files, Ships History Branch, Naval Historical Center
Barrows, Nathaniel A. Blow All Ballast! The Story of the Squalus. New York: Dodd, Mead & Co, 1940. 
Department's Report on "Squalus" Disaster. Washington: U.S. G.P.O., 1939. 
Gray, Edwyn. Disasters of the Deep: A Comprehensive Survey of Submarine Accidents and Disasters. Annapolis, Md: Naval Institute Press, 2003. 
Naval Historical Center (U.S.). USS Squalus (SS-192) The Sinking, Rescue of Survivors, and Subsequent Salvage, 1939. Washington, D.C.: Naval Historical Center, 1998. http://www.history.navy.mil/faqs/faq99-1.htm
LaVO, Carl. Back from the Deep: The Strange Story of the Sister Subs Squalus and Sculpin. Annapolis, Md: Naval Institute Press, 1994.
Mariners' Museum (Newport News, Va.). Salvage of the Squalus: Clippings from Newspapers, May 25, 1939-January 20, 1941. Newport News, Va: Mariners' Museum, 1942. 
Portsmouth Naval Shipyard (U.S.). Technical Report of the Salvage of U.S.S. Squalus. Portsmouth, N.H.: U.S. Navy Yard, 1939. 
Falcon (Salvage ship), and Albert R. Behnke. Log of Diving During Rescue and Salvage Operations of the USS Squalus: Diving Log of USS Falcon, 24 May 1939 – 12 September 1939. Kensington, Maryland: Reprinted by Undersea & Hyperbaric Medical Society, 2001
Diving in the U.S. Navy a brief history. http://purl.access.gpo.gov/GPO/LPS88384
NavSource Online: Submarine Photo Archive: Submarine Rescue Chamber

External links
 "New Rescue Chamber Laughs At The Sea", September 1931, Popular Mechanics
 Submarine Rescue Chamber on the International Submarine Escape and Rescue Liaison Office (ISMERLO) website.

Submarine rescue equipment